Lars Søren Ravn (born 1959 in Aalborg) is an autodidact Danish artist. Lars Ravn is a member of Danish Art Association Corner.

References 

Danish contemporary artists
20th-century Danish artists
21st-century Danish artists
1959 births
Living people
Neo-expressionist artists